This is a list of diseases starting with the letter "I".

I
 I cell disease
 Inverted Gentile Disorder

Ib
 IBIDS syndrome

Ic

Icf
 ICF syndrome

Ich
 Ichthyoallyeinotoxism
 Ichthyophobia
 Ichthyosiform erythroderma corneal involvement deafness
 Ichthyosis alopecia eclabion ectropion mental retardation
 Ichthyosis and male hypogonadism
 Ichthyosis bullosa of Siemens
 Ichthyosis cheek eyebrow syndrome
 Ichthyosis congenita biliary atresia
 Ichthyosis deafness mental retardation skeletal anomaly
 Ichthyosis follicularis atrichia photophobia syndrome
 Ichthyosis hepatosplenomegaly cerebellar degeneration
 Ichthyosis hystrix, Curth Macklin type
 Ichthyosis linearis circumflexa
 Ichthyosis male hypogonadism
 Ichthyosis mental retardation Devriendt type
 Ichthyosis mental retardation dwarfism renal impairment
 Ichthyosis microphthalmos
 Ichthyosis tapered fingers midline groove up
 Ichthyosis vulgaris
 Ichthyosis, erythrokeratolysis hemalis
 Ichthyosis, keratosis follicularis spinulosa Decalvans
 Ichthyosis, lamellar recessive
 Ichthyosis, Netherton syndrome

Id
 Idaho syndrome
 Idiopathic acute eosinophilic pneumonia
 Idiopathic adolescent scoliosis
 Idiopathic adult neutropenia
 Idiopathic alveolar hypoventilation syndrome
 Idiopathic congenital nystagmus, dominant, X- linked
 Idiopathic diffuse interstitial fibrosis
 Idiopathic dilatation of the pulmonary artery
 Idiopathic dilation cardiomyopathy
 Idiopathic double athetosis
 Idiopathic edema
 Idiopathic eosinophilic chronic pneumopathy
 Idiopathic facial palsy
 Idiopathic hypereosinophilic syndrome
 Idiopathic infection caused by BCG or atypical mycobacteria
 Idiopathic juvenile osteoporosis
 Idiopathic pulmonary fibrosis
 Idiopathic pulmonary haemosiderosis
 Idiopathic sclerosing mesenteritis
 Idiopathic thrombocytopenic purpura
 Iduronate 2-sulfatase deficiency

Ie–Im
 IFAP syndrome
 IgA deficiency
 IgA nephropathy
 IgA vasculitis
 IGDA syndrome
 IgG4-related disease
 Illum syndrome
 Illyngophobia
 Ilyina–Amoashy–Grygory syndrome
 Imaizumi–Kuroki syndrome
 Iminoglycinuria
 Immotile cilia syndrome, due to defective radial spokes
 Immotile cilia syndrome, due to excessively long cilia
 Immotile cilia syndrome, Kartagener type
 Immune deficiency, familial variable
 Immune thrombocytopenia
 Immunodeficiency, primary
 Immunodeficiency, secondary
 Immunodeficiency with short limb dwarfism
 Immunodeficiency, microcephaly with normal intelligence
 Imperforate anus
 Imperforate oropharynx costo vertebral anomalies
 Impetigo

In

In
 Inactive colon

In–Inz
 Inborn amino acid metabolism disorder
 Inborn branched chain aminoaciduria
 Inborn error of metabolism
 Inborn metabolic disorder
 Inborn renal aminoaciduria
 Inborn urea cycle disorder
 Incisors fused
 Inclusion-cell disease
 Inclusion conjunctivitis
 Incontinentia pigmenti
 Incontinentia pigmenti achromians
 Indomethacin antenatal infection
 Induced delusional disorder

Inf–Inh
 Infant epilepsy with migrant focal crisis
 Infant respiratory distress syndrome
 Infantile apnea
 Infantile axonal neuropathy
 Infantile convulsions and paroxysmal choreoathetosis, familial
 Infantile digital fibromatosis
 Infantile dysphagia
 Infantile multisystem inflammatory disease
 Infantile myofibromatosis
 Infantile onset spinocerebellar ataxia
 Infantile recurrent chronic multifocal osteomyolitis
 Infantile sialic acid storage disorder
 Infantile spasms broad thumbs
 Infantile spasms
 Infantile striato thalamic degeneration
 Infectious arthritis
 Infectious myocarditis
 Infective endocarditis
 Inflammatory breast cancer
 Infundibulopelvic stenosis multicystic kidney
 Influenza
 Inguinal hernia
 Inhalant abuse
 Inhalant abuse, aliphatic hydrocarbons
 Inhalant abuse, aromatic hydrocarbons
 Inhalant abuse, ketones
 Inhalant abuse, haloalkanes
 Inhalant abuse, nitrites

Ins
 Congenital insensitivity to pain
 Instability mitotic non disjunction syndrome
 Insulinoma
 Insulin-resistance type B
 Insulin-resistant acanthosis nigricans, type A

Int
 Intercellular cholesterol esterification disease
 Interferon gamma, receptor 1, deficiency
 Internal carotid agenesis
 Intraocular lymphoma
 Interstitial cystitis
 Interstitial lung disease
 Interstitial pneumonia
 Intestinal atresia multiple
 Intestinal lipodystrophy
 Intestinal lymphangiectasia
 Intestinal malrotation facial anomalies familial type
 Intestinal pseudoobstruction chronic idiopathic
 Intestinal pseudo-obstruction
 Intestinal spirochetosis
 Intoeing
 Intracranial aneurysms multiple congenital anomaly
 Intracranial arteriovenous malformations
 Intractable singultus
 Intrathoracic kidney vertebral fusion
 Intrauterine growth retardation mandibular malar hypoplasia
 Intrauterine infections
 Intrinsic factor, congenital deficiency of

Io–Iv
 Iodine antenatal infection
 Iodine deficiency
 Iophobia
 Iridocyclitis
 Iridogoniodysgenesis, dominant type
 Iris dysplasia hypertelorism deafness
 Iritis
 Iron deficiency
 Iron overload
 Irons–Bhan syndrome 
 Irritable bowel syndrome
 Isaacs–Mertens syndrome
 Isaacs syndrome
 Ischiadic hypoplasia renal dysfunction immunodeficiency
 Ischiopatellar dysplasia  Isochromosome 18p syndrome
 Isochromosome i (5p)
 Isochromosome 18p syndrome
 Isosporosiasis
 Isotretinoin embryopathy
 Isthmian coarctation
 Ivemark syndrome
 Ivic syndrome

I